Aloísio da Silva Filho  (born 9 December 1974), known as Aloísio, is a Brazilian footballer who plays as a goalkeeper for Potiguar de Mossoró.

He spent most of his career with Campeonato Brasileiro Série B and Série C teams. He also spent most of his career in Brazil Northeast Region, for clubs in Ceará, Rio Grande do Norte, Sergipe and Bahia.

He has the same given name along with his father, thus has a suffix Filho in his name.

Career
Aloísio won promotion to Campeonato Brasileiro Série A in November 2002 as the third place of 2002 Campeonato Brasileiro Série B.

In January 2005, he was signed by Colo-Colo (BA) to play at 2005 Campeonato Baiano.

In July 2005 he left for another Bahia team, Campeonato Brasileiro Série C side Juazeiro, signed a 1-year contract. He signed a 3-moth contract with Lagartense in June 2006 for Copa Governo do Estado de Sergipe and Copa Sergipe–Bahia. He then returned to Bahia state, signed a contract with Fluminense de Feira, also for Copa Sergipe–Bahia.

In January 2007, he went to Rio Grande do Norte again, for Potiguar de Mossoró. Before the start of the national league, he left for Sergipe side Itabaiana before returned to Rio Grande do Norte for ABC Futebol Clube on 2 July 2007.

ABC FC
He was the backup keeper for Raniere at 2007 Campeonato Brasileiro Série C, played twice. The team won promotion as the fourth place. In 2008 season, he became the third keeper, after Paulo Musse and Raniere.

ICASA
In February 2009 he left for Campeonato Brasileiro Série C side ICASA. He was the backup keeper for Ari and the team finished as the bottom of 2009 Campeonato Cearense and relegated.

Aloísio started all 12 matches in Série C which won promotion to National Série B as losing semi-finalist. He was the first choice keeper for the team at 2010 Campeonato Cearense Segunda Divisão, which aimed to promotion, but lost his starting place to Mauro since round 7.

Returned to Fluminense de Feira
In March 2010 he left for Fluminense de Feira Futebol Clube to play for 2010 Campeonato Baiano, 2010 Campeonato do Nordeste, 2010 Copa Governador do Estado da Bahia and 2010 Campeonato Brasileiro Série D. He was the first choice ahead Tigre, played the first 4 matches of Série D, and replaced by Tigre in the 9th minute in the 4th match. He was dropped from squad for the rest of the matches under new coach (técnico) Luiz Carlos Cruz, which also his coach at Fortaleza. The team used Tigre and then new signing Beto. He only appeared once in 2010 Copa Governador do Estado da Bahia as unused bench on 11 September. The team used inferior squad as the match was one day before the Série D match and the head coach used third keeper Gil as starting keeper.

In January 2011 he was re-signed by Potiguar de Mossoró until the end of 2011 Campeonato Potiguar.

Career statistics

7Unknown appearances in 2005 Campeonato Baiano
8Unknown appearances in 2006 Campeonato Baiano
9Unknown appearances in 2006 Copa Governo do Estado de Sergipe
10Unknown appearances in 2006 Copa Sergipe–Bahia
11Unknown appearances in 2007 Campeonato Potiguar.
12Unknown appearances in 2007 Copa Governo do Estado de Sergipe
13Unknown appearances in 2008 Campeonato Potiguar.
14Unknown appearances in 2009 Campeonato Potiguar.
15Include 5 appearances in 2010 Campeonato Cearense Segunda Divisão.
16Include 4 appearances in 2010 Campeonato Baiano and 10 appearances in 2010 Campeonato do Nordeste.

Honours

Regional
Fluminense
Copa Sergipe–Bahia: 2006

State
Itabaiana
Copa Governo do Estado de Sergipe: 2006

ICASA
Campeonato Cearense Segunda Divisão: 2010

References

External links
 Futpedia Profile 
 
 Profile at ABC FC official site 
 Profile at ABC FC fans site 
 websoccerclub 

Brazilian footballers
Club Sportivo Sergipe players
Associação Desportiva Confiança players
Fortaleza Esporte Clube players
Colo Colo de Futebol e Regatas players
Juazeiro Social Clube players
Fluminense de Feira Futebol Clube players
ABC Futebol Clube players
Association football goalkeepers
Sportspeople from Bahia
1974 births
Living people